Michael Cheukoua (born 13 January 1997) is a Cameroonian professional footballer who plays as a winger for Austria Lustenau.

Career
Cheukoua began his senior career in his native Cameroon with Canon Yaoundé. He transferred to the Austrian club Rheindorf Altach on 26 August 2017, and initially was assigned to their reserves before playing for their senior team. He joined Wiener Neustädter on loan for the 2018–19 season. In the summer of 2021, he transferred to SV Horn .

Cheukoua moved to crossdown rivals Austria Lustenau on 24 June 2021, signing a 2-year contract. In his first season with them, he helped them win the 2021–22 and earn promotion into the Austrian Football Bundesliga.

International career
Cheukoua played for the Cameroon U23s at the 2019 Africa U-23 Cup of Nations.

Honours
Austria Lustenau
 Austrian Football Second League: 2021–22

References

External links
 
 OEFB Profile

1997 births
Living people
Cameroonian footballers
Cameroon youth international footballers
SC Rheindorf Altach players
SC Wiener Neustadt players
SK Austria Klagenfurt players
Austrian Football Bundesliga players
2. Liga (Austria) players
Austrian Regionalliga players
Association football wingers
Cameroonian expatriate footballers
Cameroonian expatriates in Austria
Expatriate footballers in Austria